Ettore is a given name, the Italian version of Hector.

People
Ettore Arrigoni degli Oddi (1867–1942), Italian naturalist
Ettore Bassi (born 1970), Italian actor and television presenter
Ettore Bastianini (1922–1967), Italian opera singer
Ettore Bastico (1876–1972), Italian World War II general
Ettore Boiardi (1897–1985), Italian-born chef famous for his Chef Boyardee brand of food products
Ettore Bugatti (1881–1947), Italian-born French automobile designer and manufacturer
Ettore Coco (1908–1991), New York City mobster
Ettore Ewen (born 1986), American professional wrestler performing in the WWE as Big E
Ettore Fieramosca (1476–1515), Italian condottiero (mercenary leader) and nobleman
Ettore Majorana (1906–1938?), Italian theoretical physicist who mysteriously disappeared
Ettore Mambretti (1859–1948), Italian general
Ettore Manni (1927–1979), Italian film actor
Ettore Maserati (1894–1990), Italian automotive engineer
Ettore Messina (born 1959), Italian basketball coach
Ettore Molinari (1867–1926), Italian chemist and anarchist
Ettore Muti (1902–1943), Italian aviator and Fascist politician
Ettore Panizza (1875–1967), Argentinian conductor and composer
Ettore Puricelli (1916–2001), Uruguayan football player and manager
Ettore Sacchi (1851–1924), Italian lawyer and politician
Ettore Scola (1931–2016), Italian screenwriter and film director
Ettore Sottsass (1917–2007), Italian architect and designer
Ettore Tito (1859–1941), Italian painter
Ettore Tolomei (1865–1952), Italian nationalist and fascist
Ettore Ximenes (1855–1926), Italian sculptor

Fictional characters
Dottor Ettore Rizzardi, the favorite coroner of the titular character of Donna Leon's Commissario Guido Brunetti crime novels

Italian masculine given names